Mosman, an electoral district of the Legislative Assembly in the Australian state of New South Wales had two incarnations, from 1913 to 1920 and from 1927 to 1991.


Election results

Elections in the 1980s

1988

1984

1981

Elections in the 1970s

1978

1976

1973

1972 by-election

1971

Elections in the 1960s

1968

1965

1962

Elections in the 1950s

1959

1956

1953

1950

Elections in the 1940s

1947

1944

1941

Elections in the 1930s

1938

1935

1932

1930

Elections in the 1920s

1927

1920 - 1927

Elections in the 1910s

1917

1913

References

New South Wales state electoral results by district